Big Enough is a 2004 documentary film about Anu Trombino, Karla and John Lizzo, Len and Lenette Sawisch, and Sharon and Ron Roskamp, who are all typical Americans in every respect, except that they are dwarfs. Twenty years after her first film, Jan Krawitz finds out what has happened to her subjects.

Big Enough was met with high critical acclaim, receiving an Independent Filmmaker Award from the Carolina Film & Video Festival and was aired as part of PBS's Point of View series in 2005.

References

External links 
 Big Enough on IMDb
 P.O.V. Hardwood - PBS's site dedicated to the film

2004 films
POV (TV series) films
Documentary films about people with disability
Films about people with dwarfism
2000s English-language films
2000s American films